The systems of transport in the British Virgin Islands include 113 kilometres of highway and a harbour at Road Town.

Roads 
 total: 200 km
 paved: 200 km
 unpaved: 0 km (2007)

Despite using left-hand traffic, most vehicles are left-hand-drive, being imported from the United States.

Ports and terminals
 Road Town

Airports

 4 (2008)

Paved runways
 total: 2
914 to 1,523 m: 1
 under 914 m: 1 (2008)

Unpaved runways
 total: 2
914 to 1,523 m: 2 (2008)

Merchant Marine 
 registered in other countries: 1 (Panama) (2008)

References